Bluemel (South German (Blümel): from a diminutive of Middle High German bluome "flower" hence a metonymic occupational name for a gardener or florist or in some cases possibly a topographic or habitational name referring to a house distinguished by the sign of a flower) is a German surname. Notable people with the surname include:

 Clifford Bluemel (1885–1973), American brigadier general
 Edward Bluemel (born 1993), English actor
 Erik Bluemel (1977–2009), assistant professor at the University of Denver Sturm College of Law
 James Bluemel, British television director

Surnames of Austrian origin
Surnames of German origin
German-language surnames